Henri Depireux (1 February 1944 – 8 April 2022) was a Belgian football player and manager.

Career
Depireux played club football for RFC Liège and Standard de Liège. He also played twice for Belgium.

After his playing career ended, Depireux became a manager in Switzerland, France. He also coached Belenenses, the Cameroon national team. and RFC Liège.

In 2006, Depireux was named manager of Congo DR national team and resigned in 2007. In 2008, he coached North African sides Olympique de Khouribga and USM Annaba.

In 2011, Depireux joined the women's team of Standard Femina Liège as head coach.

In February 2019, he took over as head coach of KVW Zaventem, a team in the 3rd amateur league, in an attempt to prevent the club being relegated to a lower division, following a difficult season.

Honours

RFC Liège
Belgian Football League third place: 1966–67
Standard Liège
Belgian Football League winner: 1968–69, 1969–70, 1970–71
R.W.D. Molenbeek
Belgian Football League runner-up: 1972–73; third place: 1973–74

References

External links
 
 Henri Depireux: «Je suis toujours deuxième...», La Libre Belgique
 

1944 births
2022 deaths
Belgian footballers
Association football midfielders
Belgium international footballers
RFC Liège players
Standard Liège players
R.W.D. Molenbeek players
Belgian Pro League players
Belgian football managers
FC Metz managers
Red Star F.C. managers
Cameroon national football team managers
Democratic Republic of the Congo national football team managers
RFC Liège managers
AC Bellinzona managers
C.S. Visé managers
Olympique Club de Khouribga managers
AS FAR (football) managers
R.F.C. Tilleur managers
Belgian expatriate football managers
Belgian expatriate sportspeople in Portugal
Expatriate football managers in Portugal
Belgian expatriate sportspeople in Italy
Expatriate football managers in Italy
Belgian expatriate sportspeople in France
Expatriate football managers in France
Belgian expatriate sportspeople in Cameroon
Expatriate football managers in Cameroon
Belgian expatriate sportspeople in Morocco
Expatriate football managers in Morocco
Belgian expatriate sportspeople in the United Arab Emirates
Expatriate football managers in the United Arab Emirates
Belgian expatriate sportspeople in the Democratic Republic of the Congo
Expatriate football managers in the Democratic Republic of the Congo